Huang Liu-chong (born 1 March 1950) is a Taiwanese luger. He competed in the men's singles and doubles events at the 1976 Winter Olympics.

References

1950 births
Living people
Taiwanese male lugers
Olympic lugers of Taiwan
Lugers at the 1976 Winter Olympics
Place of birth missing (living people)